Ted Phillips is an American businessman and the former President and CEO of the National Football League's Chicago Bears and was a part of the organization since 1984. He is only the fourth president of the 100-year-old organization, the others being Michael McCaskey, George Halas Jr., and "Papa Bear" George Halas, and the new fifth president Kevin Warren. Phillips is one of only two individuals in the NFL to serve on both the NFL Working Club Executive committee and the NFL Senior Club Executive committee, whose mission is to analyze both the financial and football operations aspects of the Collective Bargaining Agreement.

Early life and family
Phillips was born in Oneida, New York and was raised in Nashua, New Hampshire. 
He graduated from The University of Notre Dame with an undergraduate degree in business and accounting. He worked for the accounting and consulting firm Ernst and Whinney, now known as Ernst & Young, as an auditor and tax accountant from 1979 to 1983.  Phillips is the father of three sons: Matthew, Max, and Frank.

Chicago Bears
Phillips began his career with the organization on September 28, 1983 as the team's Controller. After about four years, he was promoted to the Director of Finance. Here, he was responsible for the club's business operations and the negotiating and signing of all player contracts. While working with the Chicago Bears, he earned his master's degree in Marketing and Management from the Kellogg Graduate School at Northwestern University in 1989. In 1993, he became the Vice President of Operations and served there for six years until his promotion to team president.

President & CEO
The organization recognized Phillips work and effort and placed him in position to improve the club. Phillips was named the Chief Executive Officer and President of the Chicago Bears on February 10, 1999, making him only the fourth president in team history, and the first who was not a member of the Halas-McCaskey family. He made many changes to the organization. In the offseason of 2001, Phillips hired Jerry Angelo as the General Manager of the team and later extended his contract in 2003 and 2006 to create stability in the front office. He also brought the Bears summer training camp back to Illinois in 2002. Fans have appreciated this by attending camp in groups of over 10,000 at the campus of Olivet Nazarene University in Bourbonnais, Illinois.

With the growing value of the team, ticket prices kept rising, but in 2009 Phillips decided to freeze ticket prices in light of the country's economic situation. Despite this, Phillips kept the Bears in the Top 10 Most Valuable NFL teams and raised the team's value to $1.09 Billion in 2011. He also voted against the new NFL rule to move up kickoffs, which had been held at the 30 yard line, to the 35-yard line, considering Special Teams have been a strong point for the Bears, but the rule passed.

In the 24 years Phillips acted as team president, the Bears have only made the playoffs six times. The Bears formally changed Phillips' responsibilities following the 2021 season, which saw the team fire head coach Matt Nagy and general manager Ryan Pace after a 6–11 finish. Phillips would no longer oversee the team's general manager, who would instead report directly to chairman George McCaskey. On September 2, 2022, Phillips announced he would retire from his role after the 2022 NFL season. The Bears announced Kevin Warren would succeed Phillips as president following the 2022 NFL season.

References

Living people
Year of birth missing (living people)
Chicago Bears executives
National Football League team presidents
Kellogg School of Management alumni
People from Nashua, New Hampshire
People from Oneida, New York
Mendoza College of Business alumni

simple:Ted Phillips